The Chicago Maroons are the intercollegiate sports teams of the University of Chicago. They are named after the color maroon. Team colors are maroon and gray, and the Phoenix is their mascot. They now compete in the NCAA Division III, mostly as members of the University Athletic Association. The University of Chicago helped found the Big Ten Conference in 1895, although it dropped football in 1939 (as inconsistent with its academic vision), its other teams remained members until 1946. Football returned as a club sport in 1963, as a varsity sport in 1969, and began competing independently in Division III in 1973. The school was part of the Midwest Collegiate Athletic Conference from 1976 to 1987, and its football team joined the Midwest Collegiate Athletic Conference's successor, the Midwest Conference (MWC), in 2017. In the 2018–19 school year, Chicago added baseball to its MWC membership, and elevated its club team in women's lacrosse to full varsity status, with that sport competing in the College Conference of Illinois and Wisconsin (CCIW).

Stagg Field is the home stadium for the re-instated football team.

Men's athletics 
Baseball
Basketball – see: Chicago Maroons men's basketball
Cross Country
Football – see: Chicago Maroons football
Soccer
Swimming & Diving
Tennis
Indoor and Outdoor Track & Field – considered two separate sports by the NCAA
Wrestling

Women's athletics 
Basketball – see: Chicago Maroons women's basketball
Cross Country
Soccer
Lacrosse
Softball
Swimming & Diving
Tennis
Indoor and Outdoor Track & Field – considered two separate sports by the NCAA
Volleyball

Big Ten Conference

The Maroons helped establish the Big Ten Conference (then known as the Intercollegiate Conference of Faculty Representatives, and commonly called the Western Conference)  at a follow-up meeting on February 8, 1896. The league initially consisted of Chicago, Purdue, Michigan, Wisconsin, Minnesota, Illinois, and Northwestern.

Jay Berwanger was awarded the first Heisman trophy in 1935.

Hall of Fame coach Amos Alonzo Stagg coached the football team from 1892–1932, the basketball team from 1920–1921, and the baseball team from 1893–1905 and 1907–1913. He encouraged players to adopt vegetarianism, believing it supported both athleticism and a "gentle and gentlemanly" sportsmanship.

The football team was dropped following the 1939 season. In explaining the reason to drop football, Robert Maynard Hutchins, the university’s president, had written acidly in The Saturday Evening Post “In many colleges, it is possible for a boy to win 12 letters without learning how to write one.” 

On March 7, 1946 the University of Chicago withdrew from the Big Ten Conference. On May 31, 1946 the resignation was formally accepted by the Big Ten Conference.

Championships

National and NCAA championships 
Basketball (poll): 1906–07, 1907–08, and 1908–09 (Helms Athletic Foundation)
Football (poll): 1905 (Helms Athletic Foundation), 1913 (Parke H. Davis)
Men's Gymnastics: 1938 (team title), 9 individual champions
Men's Soccer: 2022
Men's Tennis: 2022
Men's Track & Field (Outdoor): 7 individual champions
Kris Alden: 1989 Men's Swimming Individual Champion
Rhaina Echols: 1999 Women's Cross Country Individual Champion, 2000 Women's Indoor (3,000-meter run and 5,000-meter run) and 2000 Women's Outdoor Individual Track Champion (5,000-meter run)
Tom Haxton: 2004 Men's Outdoor Track & Field Individual Champion (10,000-meter run)
Adeoye Mabogunje: 2004 Men's Outdoor Track & Field Individual Champion (Triple Jump)
Peter Wang: 1991 & 1992 Wrestling Individual Champion
Liz Lawton: 2010 Women's Outdoor Track & Field Individual Champion (5,000-meter run and 10,000-meter run)
Michael Bennett: 2014 Men's Indoor Track & Field Individual Champion (Pole Vault)
Michelle Dobbs: 2016 Women's Indoor Track & Field Individual Champion (800-meter run)
Khia Kurtenbach: 2017 Women's Cross Country Individual Champion

University Athletic Association championships 
Men's Basketball: 1997, 1998, 2000, 2001, 2007, 2008
Women's Basketball: 1989, 2008, 2011, 2012
Men's Cross Country: 2002, 2004
Women's Cross Country: 1992, 1993, 2012, 2013, 2022
Football: 1998, 2000, 2005, 2010, 2014
Men's Soccer: 2001, 2009, 2014, 2016, 2017, 2018, 2019, 2022
Women's Soccer: 1994, 1996, 1999, 2010
Softball: 1996
Men's Track & Field (Indoor): 2002, 2008
Women's Track & Field (Indoor): 2008, 2010, 2014, 2015, 2018
Women's Track & Field (Outdoor): 2015
Wrestling: 1989, 1990, 1992, 1995, 1997, 1998, 2001, 2002, 2003, 2004, 2005, 2007, 2009, 2010, 2011
Women's Tennis: 2010, 2012, 2022
Men's Tennis 2018, 2022

 Midwest Conference championships 
All championships listed here were won when the league was known as the Midwest Collegiate Athletic Conference, and only sponsored men's sports. The Midwest Conference was established in its current form in 1994 with the merger of the MCAC and Midwest Athletic Conference for Women.Men's Soccer: 1978Men's Tennis: 1984Women's Tennis: 1983Men's Track & Field (Indoor): 1980Women's Track & Field (Outdoor): 1983, 1984

 Big Ten Conference championships Baseball: 1896, 1897, 1898, 1899, 1913Men's Basketball: 1907, 1908, 1909, 1910, 1920, 1924Men's Fencing: 1927-28, 1933–34, 1935–36, 1936–37, 1937–38, 1938–39, 1939–40, 1940–41Football: 1899, 1905, 1907, 1908, 1913, 1922, 1924Men's Golf: 1922, 1924, 1926Men's Gymnastics: 1909, 1914, 1917, 1920, 1921, 1922, 1924, 1926, 1927, 1928, 1930, 1931, 1932, 1933, 1934Men's Swimming: 1916, 1919, 1921Men's Tennis: 1910, 1913, 1914, 1915, 1916, 1918, 1920, 1921, 1922, 1923, 1924, 1929, 1930, 1931, 1933, 1934, 1935, 1937, 1938, 1939Men's Track & Field (Indoor): 1911, 1915, 1917Men's Track & Field (Outdoor)': 1905, 1908, 1917

 Fight songWave the Flag (For Old Chicago)'' is the fight song for the Maroons. Gordon Erickson wrote the lyrics in 1929. The tune was adapted from Miami University's "Marching Song" written in 1908 by Raymond H. Burke, a University of Chicago graduate who joined Miami's faculty in 1906.

The song is traditionally sung by the players at midfield after all home victories.

See also
The University of Chicago Band

References

External links